R&B Divas: Atlanta (formerly titled R&B Divas) is  an American reality television series that premiered TV One starring several R&B singers. The show offers an inside look at how the award-winning singers balance their music careers and personal lives as they work towards producing an album in memory of Whitney Houston. The series premiered on August 20, 2012, with the premiere delivering a ratings record for TV One, with almost 900,000 viewers tuning in for the show's first episode.

In February 2013,  a spin-off titled R&B Divas: Los Angeles was announced. The cast includes Lil Mo, Chante Moore, Kelly Price, Claudette Ortiz, Michel'le and Dawn Robinson. The eight-episode first season premiered on July 10, 2013. In the second season Chrisette Michelle and Leela James joined the cast after the departures of Kelly Price and Dawn Robinson

R&B and soul singer Angie Stone and LaTocha Scott, formerly of the R&B group Xscape, joined the cast for season 2. On November 18, 2013, the series was renewed for a third season. Season 3 premiered on April 23, 2014, with LaTavia Roberson and Kameelah Williams joining the cast. Syleena Johnson, Angie Stone, Monifah Carter and Keke Wyatt are returning. On January 14, 2015, the series was cancelled after three seasons.

Synopsis
R&B Divas: Atlanta stars singers Monifah Carter, Faith Evans, Nicci Gilbert, Syleena Johnson and KeKe Wyatt. The first season chronicles their friendships, professional endeavors and personal lives as they work, play and struggle to get their lives and careers back on track. Spurred by Evans, the quintet comes together to produce a charity album inspired by Whitney Houston. Proceeds from the album will benefit the Whitney E. Houston Academy of Creative and Performing Arts in East Orange, New Jersey. The show deals with a candid look at other career and personal issues affecting the singers, including motherhood, divorce, alcohol, physical abuse and sexuality. Originally titled Ladies of R&B, R&B Divas: Atlanta is filmed primarily in Atlanta, with additional shooting in Washington, D.C., New York City and New Orleans.

Cast

Overview

Episodes

Season 1 (2012)

Season 2 (2013)

Season 3 (2014)

References

External links

2010s American reality television series
2012 American television series debuts
Television shows set in Atlanta
English-language television shows
African-American reality television series
Rhythm and blues
TV One (American TV channel) original programming